Lindheimera is a genus of flowering plants in the tribe Heliantheae within the family Asteraceae found in North America. The genus is named for German-American botanist Jacob Lindheimer, 1801–1879.

Species
The following species are recognised in the genus:
 Lindheimera mexicana A.Gray - Hidalgo, México State, Puebla, Veracruz, Tlaxcala
 Lindheimera texana A.Gray & Engelm. - Texas, Oklahoma, Arkansas, Louisiana

References

Heliantheae
Flora of North America
Asteraceae genera
Taxa named by Asa Gray
Taxa named by George Engelmann